Dan Apostol (12 July 1957 Bucharest – 4 March 2013 Bucharest) was a Romanian writer and researcher, specialized in several border domains of aviation, history, archeology, ancient civilisations, art, biology, anthropology, palaeontology and cryptozoology.

Books

 Enigmas... for now, 1984, 1986 (second edition), 2018 (third edition).
 Flight 19, 1985, 2020
 Mysteries of the Earth, 1987
 The Unknown Nature, 1989
 Footprints into the Cosmos, 1989
 Ancient Civilizations on Earth, 1990
 Lords of the Depths, 1991
 From a Lost World, 1993
 Explorers of the Infinite, 1997
 Atlantida and Pacifida - Ancient Protocivilizations, 1998, 2003 (second edition)
 World of the Dragons, 2000
 Chronicles from Outer Worlds, 2001
 Monsters of the Depths, 2003
 Pacifida - The Missing Continent, 2003
 Survivors of the Cuaternar, 2003
 Aliens in our Prehistory, 2003, 2014
 Unexplained Disappearances during the Great Wars, 2003, 2005, 2020
 Atlantis - The Lost Empire, 2004 
 The Mystery of the Golden Cities, 2004
 The Fall of the Angel, 2004 (fiction)
 The War of the Worlds, 2005, 2014
 Dinosaurs - a Reality in the History of the Last Millennia, 2005
 Unexplained Aerial Phenomena - An Updated History from the Secret Files, 2005, 2014 
 Women-warriors in the Battles that Changed the World, 2005
 The Cities of the Giant Octopus, 2006, 2014
 The warriors from Beyond, 2014
 Atlantis and other lost worlds, 2015, 2020
 Forgotten heroes, 2015
 The Hunters of the Other World, 2015 (fiction)
 Dinosauria, 2018
 Mysterious Disappearances, 2020
 UFO - Hidden Truths, 2021
 UFO - Danger!, 2021

Anthologies

 Coauthor of the Antares anthologies with Rodica Bretin, 4 volumes (1991–1995) about ancient civilisations, unexplained phenomena, cryptozoology and fantastic literature.

International awards

 The Award for Short Prose at the Fantasia Festival (Copenhague, Denmark), 1998 for the story Hunters from Beyond
 The Great Award for the best Foreign Prose, of the Fantasia Art Association (Cornwall, Great Britain), 2004, for the story The Fall of the Angel

Editorialist

 Between 1982 and 2010, Dan Apostol has published 800 articles, studies and editorials in 25 Romanian, French, Italian and British publication (including Science et Avenir, Science et Vie, Nature, Natural History, The Historian, Magazin, Astra, Romania Literara, Stiinta si Tehnica, Meridian, Baricada, SLAST, Magazin International, Terra XXI, Jurnalul de Bucuresti, START 2001) and 6 anthologies from England and Romania.

Audiovisual work

 Chief Programs Officer (1993) and Executive Manager (1994–1996) at the Canal b National Company of Film, Television and Video
 In 1993 has directed two television documentaries: Stalin - A Nightmare for Eternity and Baia Mare - in Search of the Hidden Cancer
 Between 1994–1996 has been the producer of all television programs distributed nationwide by the Canal b National Company of Film, Television and Video
 Between 1982–2010 has been the producer, host or guest for 300 TV and Radio shows at 16 Romanian, French, Italian and British Television and Radio Channels (Arte, Rai Due, ZDF, RTL, Discovery, Discovery Civilisation, BBC, TVR 1, TVR 2, TV Sigma, Tele 7 abc, Radio Romania 1 and 2, Radio Bucharest, Radio Total and Radio Tinerama)

References

 SF Dictionary, Nemira Publishing House, Bucharest, Romania, 1999
 Catalogue of the Authors, Pocket Book Publishing House, Bucharest, Romania, 2006
 The Historian, Truro, Cornwall, Great Britain, 2005, 2006
 Catalogue des auteurs, Excelsior Publications SA, Paris, France, 2007
 Today's Romanian writers, Gates of the Orient Publishing House, Iasi, 2011
 Today's Romanian authors, Arial Publishing House, Ploiesti, Romania, 2013

1957 births
2013 deaths
Writers from Bucharest
Ufologists
Romanian writers